Mark Vernon Temple (March 28, 1911 – December 20, 1990) was an American football running back in the National Football League for the Boston Redskins and the Brooklyn Dodgers.  He played college football at the University of Oregon.

1911 births
1990 deaths
People from Pendleton, Oregon
American football running backs
Oregon Ducks football players
Boston Redskins players
Brooklyn Dodgers (NFL) players